Chogha Zanbil (also Romanized as Choghā Zanbīl; also known as Chaqā-ye Zanbīl, Choqāy Zanbīl, Choqā Zanbīl, Chowghār Zanbīl, and Ma‘bad-e Choghā Zanbīl) is a village in Shavur Rural District, Shavur District, Shush County, Khuzestan Province, Iran. At the 2006 census, its population was 81, in 9 families.

References 

Populated places in Shush County